The Restaurant Adventures of Caroline & Dave is a 13-part docudrama Canadian television series which premiered on January 6, 2010, on the W Network. Produced by Mountain Road Productions, the series follows neophyte restaurateurs and couple, Caroline Ishii and Dave Loan as they struggle to realize their dream of opening ZenKitchen, a vegetarian restaurant situated in Ottawa’s trendy Chinatown.

Episodes are currently airing on OWN Canada Fridays at 3PM ET (Eastern Time Zone).

Synopsis
In this year-long journey things rarely go smoothly for Caroline and Dave as the couple find themselves on a rollercoaster ride of real estate troubles, money woes, AWOL contractors, fires in the kitchen and staffing problems. Each has given up a successful career, putting their life savings, relationship and sanity on the line in order to share their passion for vegetarian cuisine, which rapidly takes the Zen out of ZenKitchen. Will building a dream restaurant push their relationship beyond the limits?

Hosts Bios
Caroline Ishii developed a passion for food and cooking as a child. Through her mother's influence she learned traditional Japanese cooking.  As her food pallet cultivated, so did her development and belief in holistic approaches to wellness which led her to the practices of Yoga and Meditation.  In Dave she found a kindred spirit sharing the dream of opening a restaurant.  With Dave's encouragement, she enrolled in the Professional Chef Training Program with New York City's famed Natural Gourmet Institute for Health and Culinary Arts.  After completing her studies and with some of the best natural food chefs in NYC and San Francisco, Caroline returned to Ottawa to open ZenKitchen. She is a member of various food organizations such as The National Capital Vegetarian Association, Just Food Ottawa, and The Toronto Vegetarian Association.

David Loan grew up surrounded by the fruit orchards, family farms and vineyards of the Niagara Peninsula. Cooking became a fast hobby at a young age for Dave as his parents introduced him to two different yet influential approaches to food; his mother being the exquisite baker and his father being the culinary experimenter. In 1996, he met Caroline at a leap year party.  A shared passion for cooking and eating nurtured their relationship and sparked the vision of owning a restaurant. Five years later, Dave committed to vegetarianism and has not looked back since. Dining experiences at high end vegan restaurants influenced his and Caroline's decision to open ZenKitchen creating their unique approach to vegan cooking. Dave's background as a political organizer lends strength to the management side of the business allowing Caroline to focus on the food.  Dave is currently studying for his sommelier certification.

Episodes

Awards

|-
| 2010
| The Restaurant Adventures of Caroline & Dave
| Gemini Award, Category: Best Original Music for a Lifestyle/Practical Information or Reality Program or Series - David Burns "Episode 12 The Last Straw"
| 
|-
| 2010
| The Restaurant Adventures of Caroline & Dave
| Summit Awards (SCA), Category: Editing/Effects - MC Gagnon "Episode 12 The Last Straw"
|  Bronze
|-

International Syndication

External links 
 http://ownca.oprah.com/Shows/Restaurant-Adventures-of-Caroline-and-Dave.aspx
 http://www.mountainroad.ca/mrp/portfolio/restaurant_adventures_of_caroline_and_dave.php
 http://www.facebook.com/pages/The-Restaurant-Adventures-of-Caroline-Dave/194423800588196?sk=wall
 http://www.zenkitchen.ca/

2010 Canadian television series debuts
2010s Canadian reality television series
W Network original programming